Nacimento Silveira (born April 11, 1981) is an Indian football player who plays in Midfield position for I-League team United Sports Club.

External links
 

1981 births
Living people
Indian footballers
Churchill Brothers FC Goa players
I-League players
Footballers from Goa
Association football midfielders